is a private junior college in Sasebo, Nagasaki, Japan, established in 1966. The predecessor of the school was founded in 1945.

External links

 Official website 

Educational institutions established in 1945
Private universities and colleges in Japan
Universities and colleges in Nagasaki Prefecture
1945 establishments in Japan
Japanese junior colleges